Bellamya unicolor is a species of large freshwater snail with a gill and an operculum, an aquatic gastropod mollusc in the family Viviparidae.

Distribution 
This species is found in Africa: Senegal, ...

Ecology
Parasites of Bellamya unicolor include trematode Aspidogaster conchicola.

References

 Germain L. (1907). Les mollusques terrestres et fluviatiles de l'Afrique centrale française. Pp. 457-617, in: A. Chevalier, L'Afrique centrale française. Augustin Challamel, Paris.
 Brown D.S. (1994). Freshwater snails of Africa and their medical importance, 2nd edition. London: Taylor and Francis, 607 p. page(s): 53, figs. 19a-c 
 van Damme D. (1984). The freshwater mollusca of Northern Africa: Distribution, biogeography and paleoecology. Developments in Hydrobiology. 25: 1-163.

External links
 Olivier, G.A. (1804). Voyage dans l'Empire Othoman, l'Égypte et la Perse, fair par ordre du Gouvernement, pendant les six premières années de la République. Tome second, ii pp. + 466 pp. + Errata (1 pp.); Atlas, 2d livraison: vii pp., pl. 18-32. Paris (H. Agasse)
 Jousseaume, F., 1886. Coquilles du Haut-Sénégal. Bulletin de la Société Zoologique de France 11: 471-502
 Rochebrune, A.-T. de. (1882). Sur quelques espèces du Haut-Sénégal. Bulletin de la Société Philomathique de Paris, series 7, 6. 33-35
 Van Damme, D. & Lange, C. (2016). Bellamya unicolor. IUCN Red List of Threatened Species

Viviparidae